Thorpe Bank is the name of a large bank south-east of Mahe Island in the Seychelles. It is larger than the whole of the land area of the Seychelles put together, and in the past was once a large island itself, created by a disturbance in the undersea ridge caused by the separation of India from Africa.

Landforms of Seychelles
Landforms of Africa
Undersea banks of the Indian Ocean